Planet P Project, first released as Planet P, is an album released in 1983 by the group Planet P Project (originally known as Planet P) led by Tony Carey. The cassette and CD editions have two bonus tracks not found on the LP.

Track listing

Side one
"Static" – 4:04
"King for a Day" – 3:57
"I Won't Wake Up" – 3:46
"Top of the World" – 4:34
"Armageddon" – 4:20
"Tranquility Base" (bonus track on cassette and CD) – 1:55

Side two
"Why Me?" – 4:06
"Power Tools" – 3:59
"Send It in a Letter" – 3:52
"Adam and Eve" – 3:36
"Only You and Me" – 3:22
"Ruby" (bonus track on cassette and CD) – 3:59

Personnel
Tony Carey – lead vocals, backing vocals, keyboards, bass, acoustic guitars, Roland rhythm composer programs
David Thomas – lead vocals on "Only You and Me"
Johan Daansen – guitars
Robert Musenpichler – guitars
Helmut Bibl – guitars
Hartmut Pfannmueller – drums and percussion
Fritz Matzka – drums and percussion
Peter Hauke – drums and percussion
Reinhard Besser - bass

Production
Recorded and mixed at Hotline Studios, Frankfurt, West Germany
Producer: Peter Hauke
Engineer: Andy Lunn, Nigel Jopson and Jon Gaffrey
Assistant Engineers: Carmine Di, Mathias Dietrich
Mixing Engineer: Andy Lunn
Originally mastered by Greg Fulginiti at Artisan Sound Recorders
All words and music by Tony Carey
Art direction: Richard Seireeni
Cover graphics: George Snow

Chart positions

Album

Singles

References 

1983 albums
Geffen Records albums
Planet P Project albums